Senate elections were held in the Czech Republic on 5 and 6 October 2018 alongside municipal elections, with a second round held on 12 and 13 October 2018. The Conservative Civic Democratic Party (ODS) won the election with 10 seats. Governing parties ANO 2011 and the Czech Social Democratic Party were heavily defeated, winning only 1 seat each. The Communist Party lost its last seat in the Senate when Václav Homolka failed to be re-elected, meaning the party would be without representation in the Senate for the first time in the history of Czech Republic. The election was considered the first major win for the opposition to Andrej Babiš' Cabinet. Commentators including Josef Kopecký also noted ODS confirmed their position as the main opposition party, ahead of the Czech Pirate Party.

Electoral system
One-third of the 81-member Senate is elected every two years, giving Senators six year terms. Members of the Senate are elected in single-member constituencies using the two-round system.

Composition of contested seats prior to the elections

List of contested districts

Campaign
The Senate election campaign ran parallel to the campaign for the municipal elections.

ANO 2011 launched their campaign on 3 September 2018. Babiš said that ANO was offering many highly qualified candidates, including Ivan Pilný and Eva Syková.

The Czech Social Democratic Party launched their campaign on 5 September 2018, focused on social issues.

The Civic Democratic Party (ODS) launched their campaign on 7 September 2018. Petr Fiala stated that the election would be a conflict of two worlds, with ODS representing the world of experienced candidates and ANO 2011 representing the world of repeated restarts.

Election forecast

Campaign finances

Results

The Civic Democratic Party (ODS) was the most successful party in the first round, with 11 candidates proceeding to the second round. ANO 2011 had 10 candidates proceeding.

Notes

References

Czech Republic
Senate
Senate elections in the Czech Republic